Thomas Day was a singer, theorbo lutenist and choirmaster.

He was appointed Master of the Children of the Chapel Royal in 1633 and was also Master of the Choristers at Westminster Abbey.

He also served as a musician to the Princes Henry and Charles.

References

English lutenists
Gentlemen of the Chapel Royal
Masters of the Children of the Chapel Royal
17th-century English musicians
Year of birth unknown
Year of death unknown